Gnorimoschema vibei is a moth in the family Gelechiidae. It was described by Wolff in 1964. It is found in western Greenland and northern Quebec.

The length of the forewings is 5–6.5 mm. The colour of the forewings varies from almost black to light grey. There are dark central spots surrounded by yellow-orange scales.

The larvae feed on Salix glauca and sometimes Betula nana. They mine the leaves of their host plant.

References

Gnorimoschema
Moths described in 1964